The title Duke of Strathearn has never existed, but there have been three dukedoms with "Strathearn" in the title:

Duke of Cumberland and Strathearn
Duke of Kent and Strathearn
Duke of Connaught and Strathearn

Strathearn is an area in Perthshire central Scotland. The river Earn which runs through the heart of the strath and is a tributary to the river Tay.

William, Prince of Wales, first-in-line to the throne of the United Kingdom, was created Duke of Cambridge and Earl of Strathearn on his wedding day.